Mlilot (lit. Bundle of ripe wheat) is a religious moshav in southern Israel. Located near Netivot and covering 4,000 dunams, it falls under the jurisdiction of Sdot Negev Regional Council.

History
The village was established in 1953 by immigrants from Iran and Kurdistan, and was initially named Sharsheret Gimel.

References

External links
Mlilot Negev Information Centre

Iranian-Jewish culture in Israel
Kurdish-Jewish culture in Israel
Moshavim
Religious Israeli communities
Populated places established in 1953
Populated places in Southern District (Israel)
1953 establishments in Israel